Grandchamp may refer to:

Places in France
Grandchamp, Ardennes, in the Ardennes department
Grandchamp, Haute-Marne, in the Haute-Marne department 
Grandchamp, Sarthe, in the Sarthe department 
Grandchamp, Yvelines, in the Yvelines department 
Grandchamp, Yonne, in the Yonne department 
Grandchamp-le-Château, in the Calvados department
Neuvy-Grandchamp, in the Saône-et-Loire department

People with the surname
Gail Grandchamp (born 1955), American boxer